The Iran International Tournament or simply known as Iran Cup was a friendly football tournament held in Tehran, Iran. The first edition was held between July 12 and July 21, 1974. The second edition was 1975 Iran International Tournament.

Six teams participated in this edition: Iran national football team A & B, Tunisia national football team, USSR U23 and club sides Zagłębie Sosnowiec from Poland and FK Teplice from Czechoslovakia.

Group stage
Group A

Group B

Semi finals

Final

Top scorers

Squads

Iran A

Iran B

USSR U23

Tunisia

Zagłębie Sosnowiec

FK Teplice

References

1974
1974
1974–75 in Iranian football
1974–75 in Czechoslovak football
1974–75 in Polish football
1974 in Soviet football
1974 in African football